Chopoqlu (also Romanized as Chopoqlū; also known as Chabqolū, Choboqlū, and Jabūk’alū) is a village in Howmeh Rural District, in the Central District of Khodabandeh County, Zanjan Province, Iran. At the 2006 census, its population was 282, in 54 families.

References 

Populated places in Khodabandeh County